Muʿādh ibn Jabal (605 – 639) was a sahabi (companion) of the Islamic prophet Muhammad. Muadh was an Ansar of Banu Khazraj and compiled the Quran with five companions while Muhammad was still alive. He was known as the one with a lot of knowledge. He was called by Muhammad "the one who will lead the scholars into Paradise."

Biography

Era of Muhammad 
Mu'adh accepted Islam before the Second pledge at al-Aqabah in submission before Muhammad. Nevertheless, he was one of those who took the pledge. He was a great companion

Muhammad sent Mu'adh as the governor of Yemen to collect zakat. When Muhammad sent Mu'adh to Yemen to teach its people about Islam, he personally bade farewell to him, walking for some distance alongside him as he set out to leave the city. It is said that Muhammad informed him that on his return to Medina, he would perhaps see only his masjid and grave. Upon hearing this, Mu'adh began to cry.

After Muhammad
Mu'adh died in 639 due to the Plague of 'Amwas.

Legacy
The college for the study of Shariah law, at Mosul University in Iraq, is named after him.

A mosque in the town of Hamtramck, Michigan, is named Masjid Mu'ath bin Jabal.

Sayings
Al-Bayhaqi narrated in Shu`ab al-Iman (1:392 #512-513), and so did al-Tabarani, that Mu`adh ibn Jabal narrated that Muhammad said: "The People of Paradise will not regret except one thing alone: the hour that passed them by and in which they made no remembrance of Allah." Ali ibn Abu Bakr al-Haythami in Majma al-Zawa'id (10:74) said that its narrators are all trustworthy (thiqat), while Suyuti declared it hasan in his Jami` al-Saghir (#7701).

Ibn al-Jawzi recorded in Siffatu Safwah that Mu'adh advised his son, "My son! Pray the prayer of he who is just about to leave and imagine that you might not be able to pray ever again. Know that the believer dies between two good deeds; one that he performed and one that he intended to perform later on."

See also

Sahaba
List of Sahabah

References

Citations

Bibliography

 

603 births
639 deaths
Companions of the Prophet
7th-century deaths from plague (disease)